Arsenic and Old Lace is a play by American playwright Joseph Kesselring, written in 1939. It has become best known through the 1944 film adaptation starring Cary Grant and directed by Frank Capra.

The play was produced by Lindsay and Crouse and directed by Bretaigne Windust, and opened on Broadway at the Fulton Theatre on January 10, 1941. On September 25, 1943, the play moved to the Hudson Theatre, closing there on June 17, 1944, having played 1,444 performances. The West End production – directed by Marcel Varnel and produced at London's Strand Theatre – enjoyed a similarly long run. Opening on December 23, 1942, and closing on March 2, 1946, it totalled 1,337 performances.

Of the 12 plays written by Kesselring, Arsenic and Old Lace was by far the most successful. According to the opening night review in The New York Times, the play was "so funny that none of us will ever forget it."

Plot

The play is a farcical black comedy revolving around the Brewster family, descended from the Mayflower settlers but now composed of   maniacs, most of them homicidal. The hero, Mortimer Brewster, is a drama critic who must deal with his crazy, murderous family and local police in Brooklyn, New York, as he debates whether to go through with his recent promise to marry the woman he loves, Elaine Harper, who lives next door and is the daughter of the local minister.

His family includes two spinster aunts, Abby and Martha Brewster, who have taken to murdering lonely old men by poisoning them with a glass of home-made elderberry wine laced with arsenic, strychnine, and "just a pinch" of cyanide; a brother, Teddy, who believes he is Theodore Roosevelt and digs locks for the Panama Canal in the cellar of the Brewster home (which then serve as graves for the aunts' victims; he thinks that they died of yellow fever); and a murderous brother, Jonathan, who has received plastic surgery performed by an alcoholic accomplice, Dr. Einstein (a character based on real-life gangland surgeon Joseph Moran) to conceal his identity, and now looks like horror-film actor Boris Karloff (a self-referential joke, as the part was originally played on Broadway by Karloff).

Throughout the play, Jonathan is plotting to kill his brother, in fact almost does in one scene. Mortimer is struggling to find solutions to rid his family of the crazy, eventually sending Teddy and his Aunts to a senior living home and letting Officer O'Hara deal with his brother.

The film adaptation follows the same basic plot, with a few minor changes.

The character Mortimer Brewster says of his family’s history that it is as if "...Strindberg wrote Hellzapoppin."

Cast

The opening night cast consisted of:

 Jean Adair as Martha Brewster
 John Alexander as Teddy Brewster
 Wyrley Birch as The Rev. Dr. Harper
 Helen Brooks as Elaine Harper
 Bruce Gordon as Officer Klein
 Henry Herbert as Mr. Gibbs
 Josephine Hull as Abby Brewster
 Allyn Joslyn as Mortimer Brewster
 Boris Karloff as Jonathan Brewster
 William Parke as Mr. Witherspoon
 John Quigg as Officer Brophy
 Anthony Ross as Officer O'Hara
 Edgar Stehli as Dr. Einstein
 Victor Sutherland as Lieutenant Rooney

Inspiration
When Kesselring taught at Bethel College in North Newton, Kansas, he lived in a boarding house called the Goerz House, and many of the features of its living room are reflected in the Brewster sisters' living room, where the action of the play is set. The Goerz House is now the home of the college president.

The "murderous old lady" plot line may also have been inspired by actual events that occurred in a house on Prospect St in Windsor, Connecticut, where a woman, Amy Archer-Gilligan, took in boarders, promising "lifetime care," and poisoned them for their pensions. M. William Phelps book The Devil's Rooming House (2010) tells the story of the police officers and reporters from the Hartford Courant who solved the case. Kesselring originally conceived the play as a heavy drama, but it is widely believed that producers Howard Lindsay and Russel Crouse (who were also well known as play doctors) convinced Kesselring that it would be much more effective as a comedy. According to The Encyclopedia of American Humorists, Lindsay and Crouse gave the play its title by adapting the title of a Frank Sullivan humor collection called Broccoli and Old Lace.

National tours
In parallel with the main Broadway run (January 10, 1941–June 17, 1944), a series of national roadshows took place, the first one in 1941–1942 which travelled to 57 cities in about 18 months, opening in Chicago on April 1, 1941. The cast comprised Laura Hope Crews as Abby Brewster, Effie Shannon as Martha Brewster, Angie Adams as Elaine Harper, Erich von Stroheim as Jonathan Brewster, Jack Whiting as Mortimer Brewster, and Forrest Orr as Teddy Brewster. In December 1941, von Stroheim returned to New York to take over the role of Jonathan Brewster from Karloff on Broadway.  

A second national tour started on August 5–18, 1943 in San Francisco, then continued in Los Angeles from August 20 until October 24. The cast included Minna Phillips as Abby Brewster, Ida Moore as Martha Brewster, Louise Arthur as Elaine Harper, Bela Lugosi as Jonathan Brewster, Michael Whalen as Mortimer Brewster, and Herbert Corthell as Teddy Brewster. 

A third national tour took place on January 29, 1944 for a run of 80 performances throughout the Midwest and East Coast that lasted until June 3, 1944. The cast included Jean Adair as Abby Brewster, Ruth McDevitt as Martha Brewster, Ann Lincoln as Elaine Harper, Bela Lugosi as Jonathan Brewster, Jack Whiting as Mortimer Brewster, and Malcolm Beggs as Teddy Brewster.

Lugosi carried on playing the role of Jonathan Brewster, 
in New Hope, PA (June 30–July 5, 1947);
in Saratoga Springs, New York (August 5, 1947);
in Sea Cliff, New York (August 9–14, 1948);
in Fayetteville, New York (July 11–16, 1949);
and in St. Louis, Missouri (January 19–25, 1954). His box office returns reflected better sales than when Boris Karloff travelled through the same cities.

TV adaptations
On January 5, 1955, a 60-minute version of the play aired on the CBS Television series The Best of Broadway. It starred Boris Karloff, recreating his stage role as homicidal maniac Jonathan Brewster. Helen Hayes and Billie Burke played his not-so-innocent aunts, Abby and Martha. Peter Lorre and Edward Everett Horton repeated their roles as Dr. Einstein and Mr. Witherspoon, which they had played in Frank Capra's film version. John Alexander, who created the role of Teddy Brewster on Broadway and reprised it in the film version, returned once more to play the role in the broadcast. Orson Bean played the role of Mortimer Brewster.

Karloff played Jonathan once more (and for the last time) on the February 5, 1962 broadcast of NBC's Hallmark Hall of Fame. Dorothy Stickney and Mildred Natwick played Abby and Martha. Joseph Kesselring had sent his original play, then titled Bodies in Our Cellar, to Stickney when she was starring opposite her husband Howard Lindsay on Broadway in Life with Father (opened in 1939), with a view to her playing Abby Brewster. It would be 23 years before she would finally play the part. Tony Randall played Mortimer in the Hallmark production and Tom Bosley played Teddy.

In 1969, Robert Scheerer directed a TV version with Helen Hayes and Lillian Gish as the elderly aunts, Bob Crane as Mortimer, Fred Gwynne as Jonathan, Sue Lyon as Elaine Harper and David Wayne as Teddy.

Revivals

The play was produced by the Edinburgh Gateway Company in 1959. In 1966, Sybil Thorndike, Athene Seyler, Julia Lockwood and Richard Briers appeared in the play in London. The play is still widely performed and has been translated into many languages, including a Russian film. 

A Broadway revival of the play ran from June 26, 1986, to January 3, 1987, at the 46th Street Theatre in New York, starring Polly Holliday, Jean Stapleton, Tony Roberts and Abe Vigoda.

Regional revivals
 
Arsenic and Old Lace resurfaced in 1998 with an Oklahoma City based revival from UCO Theatricals University Of Central Oklahoma starring Betty Garrett, Carole Cook and Michael Stever.
 A revival was mounted in February 2011 at the Dallas Theater Center starring Betty Buckley and Tovah Feldshuh.
 A Hebrew version was staged at the Habima Theatre in Tel Aviv with the opening night on October 29, 2012, with Lea Koenig and Dvora Kaydar in the main roles.
 On November 19, 2016, Independent Theatre Pakistan opened their new season with a rendition of the performance at Ali Auditorium in Lahore, Pakistan.
 The Maitland Repertory Theatre in Maitland, Australia, put on a production of the play from October 9 to 27, 2019, by director Colin Delane.
 Open Space Theatre's Bangla rendition of the play, from director M. Arifur Rahman, premiered at the Bangladesh Mahila Samiti auditorium in Dhaka on February 11, 2022.

References

Further reading

External links
 Plot summary for Arsenic and Old Lace (1944 film), IMDb
 1952 Best Plays radio adaptation at Internet Archive

1941 plays
American plays adapted into films
Broadway plays
Brooklyn in fiction
Comedy thriller plays
Plays by Joseph Kesselring
Plays set in New York City
Works about plastic surgery